Thorvaldsen is a surname.

People with the name include: 
 Bertel Thorvaldsen (1770–1844), Danish/Icelandic sculptor
 Randi Thorvaldsen (1925–2011), Norwegian speedskater
 Thor Thorvaldsen (1909–1987), Norwegian Olympic sailor
 Unn Thorvaldsen (born 1943), Norwegian javelin thrower

See also 
 Thorvaldson (disambiguation)

Patronymic surnames